Eric J. Lyman is an American journalist, writer and ghost writer.

Lyman graduated from Florida State University. He has written on topics from South America, including the thesis that the border conflict between Peru and Ecuador could be based on pre-Columbian Inca roots, and was the first to break the story that the U.S. government was guilty of using illegal poison to eradicate coca crops in the Amazon jungle, contributing to a reversal of U.S. policy in this area.

His work has been published in periodicals, including the Xinhua, San Francisco Chronicle, National Geographic News, Reason Magazine, USA Today, The Hollywood Reporter, UPI and The Wall Street Journal. He is also an editor and columnist for The American, a monthly magazine published in Rome.

References

External links
ericjlyman.com

1965 births
Florida State University alumni
American male journalists
American columnists
American magazine editors
Women magazine editors
American investigative journalists
21st-century American historians
21st-century American male writers
Living people
20th-century American journalists
American male non-fiction writers